Bosqueiopsis is a genus of flowering plants belonging to the family Moraceae.

Its native range is Congo to Mozambique.

Species:

Bosqueiopsis gilletii

References

Moraceae
Moraceae genera
Taxa named by Émile Auguste Joseph De Wildeman
Taxa named by Théophile Alexis Durand